Cerro Renca (Spanish for:Renca Hill) is a hill straddling the border between Quilicura to the north and Renca to the south, in the city of Santiago, Chile.

References

Geography of Santiago, Chile
Hills of Chile
Mountains of Santiago Metropolitan Region